Ladder Creek Glacier is in North Cascades National Park in the U.S. state of Washington and is a northwest tongue of the larger Neve Glacier. Ladder Creek Glacier added  between 1950 and 1979, but lost  from 1979 to 2006.

See also
List of glaciers in the United States

References

Glaciers of the North Cascades
Glaciers of Whatcom County, Washington
Glaciers of Washington (state)